Green Hill Reservoir is a pair of reservoirs in Chapel Hill, Brisbane, Queensland, Australia. Two underground concrete reservoirs,  each, were built in 1968. They are one of the largest potable water reservoirs in Brisbane.

Amenities 
The surrounding parkland is an off-leash dog park , but, unusually for Brisbane, it is unfenced.

Being located on a local high point, there are views to the Brisbane CBD and across the western suburbs of Brisbane. It is known as Tom Gaffney Lookout.

See also

List of dams and reservoirs in Australia

References

External links

Map of SEQWater Major Assets

Reservoirs in Queensland
Dams completed in 1968
1968 establishments in Australia